Lachlan is a rural residential locality in the local government area of Derwent Valley in the South-east region of Tasmania. The 2016 census determined a population of 841 for the state suburb of Lachlan.

History
Lachlan is a confirmed suburb/locality.

Geography
The boundaries of the locality are almost all survey lines. The Lachlan River flows through from south to north.

Road infrastructure
The C613 route (Lachlan Road) enters from the north and runs to the centre of the locality, where it ends.

References

Localities of Derwent Valley Council
Towns in Tasmania